A grenade insignia is a form of emblem which represents a stylized old style of hand grenade, with a rising flame. This symbol is used as a charge in heraldry and is also featured on the uniforms of numerous military units.

Military usage
The insignia is featured on the uniforms of such military units as the:
French Foreign Legion
Italian Carabinieri
Italian Fanteria
Italian Cavalleria
Italian Trasmissioni
Italian Granatieri di Sardegna
Italian Trasporti e Materiali
Italian Engineers Corps
Italian Bersaglieri
Dutch Koninklijke Marechaussee
Finnish artillery
The Grenadiers Regiment of the Indian Army
British and Commonwealth Grenadier Guards Regiments
British Royal Regiment of Fusiliers
Royal Canadian Engineers
Commissioned Officers of the British Royal Engineers
Commissioned Officers of the British Honourable Artillery Company
Commissioned Officers of the British Royal Artillery (collar badge)
Norwegian artillery troops
Portuguese artillery troops
National Guard of Ukraine
Ukrainian mechanized infantry
Officers of the Hellenic Army
Commissioned Officers of the Armed Forces of Malta
Royal Life Guards (Denmark) 
Brazilian artillery troops
Master Gunnery Sergeant insignia of the US Marine Corps
United States Army Ordnance Corps
Romanian infantry troops
South African Army Air Defence Artillery Formation

Example images

British Army

French military

Italian military

Ukrainian military

United States Armed Forces

See also
Bomb (icon)

Military insignia
Heraldic charges